Alpha is an almost-exclusively masculine given name.

Notable people named Alpha include:

 Alpha Acosta (born 1973), Mexican actress
 Alpha Bangura (born 1980), American-Sierra Leone basketball player
 Alpha Barry (born 1970), Burkinabé politician and journalist
 Alpha Blondy (born 1953), reggae singer and international recording artist
 Alpha L. Bowser (1910–2003), US Marine Corps lieutenant general
 Alpha Brumage (1880-1963), American football player and coach of football, basketball and baseball
 Alpha Chiang (born 1927), American mathematical economist, professor, and author
 Alpha Condé (born 1938), Guinean politician, fourth president of Guinea
 Alpha Yaya Diallo, Guinean-born Canadian guitarist, singer and songwriter
 Alpha Diallo (basketball, born 1997), American professional basketball player in France
 Alpha Mandé Diarra (born 1954), Malian author
 Alpha Jamison (1875–1962), American football player and coach of football and basketball
 Alpha Kaba (born 1996), French professional basketball player in Turkey
 Alpha B. Kamara (born 1978), sprinter from Sierra Leone
 Alpha Oumar Konaré (born 1946), Malian politician, former President of Mali
 Alpha Nyan (born 1978), Norwegian retired footballer
 Alpha Rwirangira (born 1986), Rwandan singer/song writer
 Alpha Sissoko (born 1997), French footballer
 Alpha Oumar Sow (Guinean footballer) (born 1997)
 Alpha Oumar Sow (Senegalese footballer) (born 1984)
 Alpha Wann (born 1989), French rapper and songwriter

Masculine given names